"The Body" is a song by American hip hop recording artist Wale. It was released on September 9, 2014, as the first single from his fourth studio album The Album About Nothing (2015). The song, produced by Soundz, features singer Jeremih. It peaked at number 87 on the Billboard Hot 100.

Music video
A music video for the track was released on December 28, 2014. It was directed by Geoffroy Faugerolas.

Samples
The song samples "You Remind Me of Something", as performed by American R&B singer R. Kelly.

Chart performance
"The Body" peaked at number 87 on the US Billboard Hot 100 chart. The song was eventually certified gold by the Recording Industry Association of America (RIAA) for sales of over 500,000 digital copies.

Charts

Certifications

References

External links

2014 singles
2014 songs
Wale (rapper) songs
Jeremih songs
Maybach Music Group singles
Atlantic Records singles
Songs written by Jeremih
Songs written by Wale (rapper)
Songs written by R. Kelly
Songs written by Soundz